The Hotspur was a British boys' paper published by D. C. Thomson & Co. From 1933 to 1959, it was a boys' story paper; it was relaunched as a comic in October 1959, initially called the New Hotspur, and ceased publication in January 1981.

Story paper
The Hotspur was launched on 2 September 1933 as a story paper, the last of the 'Big Five'. The first issue came with a black mask as a free gift and contained an offer for an electric shock machine:

Thomson's 'Big Five' papers were extremely successful; the name was used by both readers and the industry. In 1939 the company advertised combined weekly sales of over a million for the group; the first issue of The Hotspur sold over 350,000 copies. The Hotspur specialised in school stories; its Red Circle School stories replaced the public school stories in rival publisher Amalgamated Press' The Gem and The Magnet as reader favourites.

Like other British children's publications, The Hotspur was published weekly, except for the Second World War and its aftermath, when as a result of paper rationing it published fortnightly, alternating with The Wizard. The original Hotspur story paper published 1197 issues, the last on 17 October 1959.

Notable characters and series
 Red Circle School, a public school with pupils from all over the world.
 Bill Sampson, also known as The Wolf of Kabul, an agent of the British Intelligence Corps, first introduced in The Wizard, appeared in illustrated format in The Hotspur.

Comic book
It relaunched in comic format as the New Hotspur on 24 October 1959, a week after the original series ceased publication, and ran for another 1,110 issues until being incorporated into The Victor on 24 January 1981. The new format contained comic strips as opposed to the old text story format. The word "new" in the title was dropped with issue #174. There were several mergers during the 1970s: with The Hornet in 1976, and with The Crunch in 1980. In January 1981 The Hotspur finally merged with The Victor.

Strips 
 The Black Sapper (1971–1973, from Rover and then The Beezer) — a genius inventor who creates "The Earthworm," a giant drilling machine used to rob banks. Eventually, the character changed to become a good guy. Drawn by Terry Patrick.
Coral Island
 Dozy Danny — eleven-year-old Danny Lorimer is constantly nodding off during the school day, as his stepfather forces him to get up at four o'clock in the morning every day to make coal briquettes.
Jonny Jett 
King Cobra — journalist Bill King transforms into the UK's very own high-tech superhero. Drawn by Ron Smith.
Spring Heeled Jackson (1977–1981) — John Jackson is a bumbling police clerk who fights crime with the aid of a fantastic costume.
 Union Jack Jackson (from 1962) — a British Royal Marine serving with the US Marine Corps in the Pacific campaign during World War II, later in Warlord. 
X-Bow

In Popular Culture 
The magazine is mentioned in the BBC sitcom Dad's Army in the 1975 Christmas special episode Series 8 Episode 7 "My Brother and I"; a copy of The Hotspur owned by Private Pike is being read by Sergeant Wilson. It is mentioned in episode 3 of The Singing Detective TV series when young Philip's mother says to him "You should have brought your Hotspur".

Notes

References

External links

 The Hotspur at the Grand Comics Database
 "Japers of the Red Circle", the Red Circle School story from The Hotspur issue number 1, at Vic Whittle's British Comics site

DC Thomson Comics titles
Defunct British comics
British boys' story papers
Comics magazines published in the United Kingdom
1933 establishments in the United Kingdom
1981 disestablishments in the United Kingdom
Magazines established in 1933
Magazines disestablished in 1981
1959 comics debuts
1981 comics endings